Midway is an unincorporated community located in the town of Onalaska, La Crosse County, Wisconsin, United States.

History
Midway was originally called "Halfway Creek", after a nearby creek; when a railroad depot was built the present name of Midway was adopted. The Midway post office closed in 1934.

In June 2013, the town of Onlaska voted to seek incorporation as a village and to call the new village "Midway". The Onalaska Town Hall is located in the unincorporated community of Midway.

Notes

Unincorporated communities in La Crosse County, Wisconsin
Unincorporated communities in Wisconsin